Kazanka is a rural locality (a settlement) in Kuyagansky Selsoviet, Altaysky District, Altai Krai, Russia. The population was 5 as of 2013. There is 1 street.

Geography 
Kazanka is located on the Kuyagan River, 62 km southwest of Altayskoye (the district's administrative centre) by road. Kuyagan is the nearest rural locality.

References 

Rural localities in Altaysky District, Altai Krai